Kodo Together is an album by Japanese drumming group Kodō, released on July 9, 2021. Guests artists include Andrea Belfi, Kevin Saunderson, Skream, and Rufus Wainwright.

References

2021 albums
Albums by Japanese artists